Frederick Francis Mathers (October 17, 1871 – June 29, 1947) was the 18th Lieutenant Governor of Nova Scotia from May 31, 1940, to November 17, 1942.

He was born in Saint John, New Brunswick, the son of Isaac Henry Mathers and Kathleen McDonnell, and was educated in Halifax, at Dalhousie Law School and Harvard Law School. In 1899, Mathers married Margaret Ethel Bligh. He was deputy provincial secretary from 1902 to 1918 and deputy attorney general from 1918 to 1940. He served in the "Scottish Rifles" Company in the First World War and as Honorary Colonel of the Rifles from 1942 until 1947.

References 

1871 births
1947 deaths
Lieutenant Governors of Nova Scotia
Harvard Law School alumni
Schulich School of Law alumni